Theo DM (2009–2011), was an English Springer Spaniel who served as a bomb detection dog for the British Army whilst stationed in Afghanistan. His handler, Lance Corporal Liam Tasker, was killed in March 2011, and Theo died within hours, following a seizure. The pair had set a new record for bomb finds during their time on deployment. Theo was awarded the Dickin Medal, also known as the animals' Victoria Cross, in 2012.

Service in Afghanistan
Liam Tasker had transferred to the Royal Army Veterinary Corps in 2007, having originally enlisted in the Royal Electrical and Mechanical Engineers in 2001, and was assigned to the 1st Military Working Dog Regiment. Theo was assigned to Tasker some two weeks prior to deployment, after the first two dogs assigned to him didn't work out.

In September 2010, Theo was posted to Afghanistan for his first tour of duty. Tasker and Theo came under fire from Taliban insurgents whilst on patrol with the 1st Irish Guards in the Nahri Saraj District in Helmand Province on 1 March 2011. Tasker was killed by a sniper, and Theo was taken back to the base by fellow soldiers. The dog suffered a seizure after reaching the base and also died, which was thought to be caused by the stress of Tasker's death. An autopsy's results were inconclusive. He was the sixth British army dog to die in Afghanistan during the conflicts in Iraq and Afghanistan. Tasker's mother Jane Duffy later said that "I think Theo died of a broken heart, nobody will convince me any different."

At the time of their deaths, the pair were the most successful individual working dog team in Afghanistan, having made more bomb finds than any other during the course of the five months they were stationed there for a total of fourteen finds. They had proved so successful that Theo's stay in the country had been extended by a month. Major Alexander Turner, Officer Commanding No 2 Company, 1st Battalion Irish Guards, said of the pair, "He used to joke that Theo was impossible to restrain but I would say the same about Lance Corporal Tasker." Both Tasker and Theo were repatriated to the UK after their deaths, arriving first in RAF Lyneham, Wiltshire. Tasker's mother has not confirmed if the pair were buried together or not, saying only, "Liam and Theo are where they should be."

Dickin Medal
On 25 October 2012, Theo was posthumously awarded the PDSA Dickin Medal in a ceremony which coincided with the launch of the 2012 poppy appeal.  The medal was awarded to the dog at Wellington Barracks, London, and was accepted on Theo's behalf by Sergeant Matthew Jones and his detection dog, Grace. Jones had served with Tasker previously.

The Dickin Medal is often referred to as the animal equivalent of the Victoria Cross.

Cultural references 

Diablo 3 has an item called Tasker & Theo, a pair of legendary gloves made to enhance the effectiveness of pets. The flavor text for the item reflects the story of Tasker and Theo: "The master and his hound were the most famed hunters of their day. He died fighting beside his favorite dog, just as the way he would have wanted it. His loyal companion soon followed."

See also
List of individual dogs

Notes

External links
PDSA Dickin Medal, including "Roll of Honor" PDF
Theo's PDSA website

Detection dogs
British Army animals
2009 animal births
2011 animal deaths
Individual dogs awarded the Dickin Medal
British Army personnel of the War in Afghanistan (2001–2021)